La Bastide-Puylaurent is a commune in the Lozère department in southern France.

The Trappist monastery Notre-Dame-des-Neiges (Our Lady of the Snows), visited by Robert Louis Stevenson in 1878 and described in his book Travels with a Donkey in the Cévennes, is about one and a half miles east of the village, in the Ardèche department. The Robert Louis Stevenson Trail (GR 70), a popular long-distance path approximately following Stevenson's journey, runs through the village.

Geography
The Chassezac forms part of the commune's southwestern border.

The town lies in the northern part of the commune, where it is crossed by the Allier, which flows northeast through the northern part of the commune.

Population

See also
Communes of the Lozère department

References

External links

La Bastide-Puylaurent in Lozere (separate texts in French, Dutch and German; photographs)
Long hiking trails through La Bastide-Puylaurent:
GR70 Stevenson Trail
GR7
GR72
GR700 Regordane Way
 Regordane Info - The independent portal for The Regordane Way or St Gilles Trail (in English and French)
GRP Cevenol hiking loop
Along the Allier river
Margeride hiking loop
GRP Montagne Ardechoise hiking loop
Little hiking loops around La Bastide-Puylaurent:
3 km
6 km
8 km
12,5 km
14 km
15 km
 by bicycle
Hamlets of the commune La Bastide-Puylaurent
Le Thort
Puylaurent

Communes of Lozère